Astrologaster is a comedy narrative adventure video game developed and published by Nyamyam. It was released for iOS on 2 May 2019, for Microsoft Windows and macOS on 9 May 2019, and for Nintendo Switch on 18 February 2021. The game centres around the historical 16th-century physician and astrologer Simon Forman and the characters he encounters, who demand diagnoses, treatments, and sometimes to be read fortunes written in the stars.

Gameplay 
The player controls Simon Forman, a real-life astrologer, occultist, and herbalist active in London during the reigns of Elizabeth I and James I of England. After examining the skies for hints about patients' personal lives, the player can suggest a treatment or course of action for them. The game was inspired by Forman's casebooks.

Development 
The game was developed by Nyamyam after creative director Jennifer Schneidereit saw Lauren Kassell present her research on Simon Forman's casebooks at the University of Cambridge. Inspired by the wealth of character and story material, and with the help of Kassel's research team, Nyamyam researched Forman's life and original patient records for inspiration for the game's characters and stories.

The game was released for iOS on 2 May 2019, for Microsoft Windows and macOS on 9 May 2019, and for Nintendo Switch on 18 February 2021.

Reception 

According to review aggregator Metacritic, the PC version received mixed or average reviews while the iOS version received generally favourable reviews from critics.

Astrologaster was featured on The Gadget Show and appeared on a number of "best of" lists for video games in 2019.

Astrologaster was nominated for "Excellence in Audio" at the 22nd Annual IGF Awards, and for "Best Music for an Indie Game", "Best Music in a Casual Game", and "Best Original Choral Composition" at the 18th Annual G.A.N.G. Awards.

References

External links 

  
 

2019 video games
Adventure games
Video games developed in the United Kingdom
IOS games
MacOS games
Video games set in London
Video games set in the 17th century
Windows games